Cannington may refer to:

 Cannington, Somerset
 Cannington, Ontario, a village
 Cannington, Western Australia, a suburb of Perth
 Cannington, Queensland, a mining location
 Cannington Manor Provincial Park, a provincial park in Saskatchewan, Canada
 Cannington Lake, a lake in Saskatchewan
 Cannington (electoral district), an electorate of the Saskatchewan Legislative Assembly
 Electoral district of Cannington, an electorate of the Western Australian Legislative Assembly
 Civil Lines, Allahabad, a neighborhood, formerly known as Cannington
 Cannington Viaduct, in Devon near Lyme Regis in Dorset